Lasionycta brunnea is a moth of the family Noctuidae. It occurs in the Rocky Mountains of Alberta north to Pink Mountain in north-eastern British Columbia, and in the Purcell and Selkirk Mountains in south-western British Columbia and north-eastern Washington.

It flies in alpine tundra and is most common near timberline.

The wingspan is 30–35 mm for males and 34–36 mm for females. Adults are on wing from mid-July through August.

External links
A Revision of Lasionycta Aurivillius (Lepidoptera, Noctuidae) for North America and notes on Eurasian species, with descriptions of 17 new species, 6 new subspecies, a new genus, and two new species of Tricholita Grote

Lasionycta